Better Place may refer to:
A Better Place, a 1997 film
Better Place (company), a former transport company
"Better Place" (Saint Asonia song), 2015
"Better Place" (Rachel Platten song), 2016
"Better Place (9.11)", a song by Michelle Williams from Heart to Yours, 2002